Dina Thanthi (known as Daily Thanthi in English) is a Tamil language daily newspaper. It was founded by S. P. Adithanar in Madurai in 1942. Dina Thanthi is India's largest daily printed in the Tamil language and the ninth largest among all dailies in India by circulation. It is printed in 16 cities across India and also prints an international edition in Dubai.

History
Dina Thanthi was established in Madurai in 1942 by S. P. Adithanar.

Circulation
This daily newspaper is published from 16 cities in India namely Bangalore, Chennai, Mumbai, Pondicherry, Coimbatore, Cuddalore, Dindigul, Erode, Madurai, Nagercoil, Salem, Thanjavur, Tiruchirappalli, Tirunelveli, Tirupur and Vellore. In the second half of 2015, the newspaper has a circulation of 1,714,743.

An international edition is printed in Dubai, United Arab Emirates for the Middle East market.

Circulation by editions

Supplements
The various supplements that come along with Daily Thanthi are as follows:

It also carries a special supplement and conducts programmes for students to prepare for board examinations and other competitive exams.

See also
 Maalai Malar
 Thanthi TV
 Hello FM
 DT Next

References

External links
 Official website

Companies based in Chennai
Mass media in Chennai
Tamil-language newspapers published in India
Newspapers established in 1942
Mass media in Coimbatore
Mass media in Madurai
Newspapers published in Tiruchirappalli
Thanthi Group
1942 establishments in India